Agham Lohana was the powerful king of Brahmanabad, (in Sindh, modern Pakistan), contemporary and opponent to Chach of Alor. Agham was belonged to the Lohana clan.

Biography
Agham Lohana is described in the Chachnama as a ruler of Brahmanabad; he is also noted to have controlled other adjacent territories known as Lakha, Sama and Sahata  He is estimated to have ruled around 632 AD. Both Hinduism and Buddhism flourished side by side. The king, Agham Lohana was a Brahmin Hindu and the governors generally professed Buddhism. 

Chach after consolidating his hold on Alor began expansion of his territories and sent a letter to Agham to submit. Chach wrote a letter to Agham.

You consider yourselves kings of the time, from your power and grandeur, origin and lineage. Though I have not inherited this kingdom and sovereignty, and this wealth and affluence, this power and dignity, from my father and grandfather, and though this country has not been ours before, still my elevation and my improved fortunes are due to the grace of God. It was not by my army that I won them, but the One God, the Peerless, the Incomparable, the Creator of the world, has given me the kingdom by the blessing of Selaij; and it is from him that I receive help in every thing. I do not depend upon any other person for assistance. He is the Accomplisher of my undertakings and the Giver of help in all my movements. He is the Bestower of victory and success in all contests and oppositions. We have been graciously javoured with the blessings of both the worlds. If (you think) your power and prestige are the creation of your own bravery, courage, resources, and splendour, then, without doubt, your fortunes will decay, and the vengeance of death is but the legitimate due of your soul.

In this letter rai Chach acknowledge old linage of Agham's royalty but Agham did not acknowledge supremacy of rai Chach. However, conflict broke out between the two, and Agham was killed. His son was established as governor of Brahmanabad, but Chach's forces occupied the lands formerly ruled by Agham.  

Chach married Agham Lohana’s widow in a political manoeuvre, and likewise wed his own niece to Agham’s son Sarhand Lohana. Further, Chach laid restrictions on Lohanas, to reduce the potential for resistance and to lower their social status; among these were bans on riding saddled horses, wearing silk and velvet, wearing headgear, and carrying weapons.

The town of Agham Kot is named after Agham, the king of Lohana dynasty.

References

History of Sindh
Chach Nama
7th-century monarchs in Asia
Sindhi people